Benet Alan Hytner  (29 December 1927 – 7 February 2023) was an English barrister and judge. He was Judge of Appeal of the Isle of Man. He was the Head of the Byrom Street Chambers in Manchester and 42 Bedford Row in London. He practiced principally in General Common Law.

Hytner was born on 29 December 1927 to Maurice and Sarah Hytner. Hytner was called to the Bar in 1952 by Middle Temple and became a Queen's Counsel in 1970. He was a Crown Court Recorder 1971–1996, Deputy High Court Judge 1974–1997, Judge of Appeal of the Isle of Man 1980–1997 and elected Leader of the Northern Circuit 1980–1984. He also served both on Bar Council and Senate of Inns of Court and Bar.

Personal life and death
Hytner married Joyce in 1954. Their children are Nicholas Hytner, Director of the National Theatre in London 2003–2015, Jenny Hytner-Marriott, Director of The Paw Seasons, Richard Hytner, worldwide deputy chairman of Saatchi & Saatchi and James Hytner.

Hytner died on 7 February 2023, at the age of 95.

References

External links
Byrom Street Chambers
42 Bedford Row

1927 births
2023 deaths
Alumni of Trinity Hall, Cambridge
Manx law
English King's Counsel
20th-century King's Counsel
English Jews